Jacek Jaśkowiak (born 10 March 1964) is a Polish politician and entrepreneur. He is the current mayor of the city of Poznań, Greater Poland Voivodeship, Poland, and a member of the Civic Platform political party.

Life and education
He graduated in law and administration from the Adam Mickiewicz University in Poznań. He also completed postgraduate studies in finance and tax law. He received a GFPS-Poland scholarship and studied at the University of Bielefeld, Germany. As a student, Jaśkowiak was a member of the Rural Youth Union (Polish: Związek Młodzieży Wiejskiej).

In the 1990s, he started to pursue a career in business and worked as a sales director at Kulczyk Tradex – a company belonging to billionaire Jan Kulczyk. In 1997, he established his own firm specializing in economic consulting. In the same year, he met Jacek Kaczmarski and worked as his manager. In 2007 he became the CEO of the Jaśkowiak Sp. Z.o.o company providing accounting services to middle-sized foreign businesses.

In 2012 and 2014, he was one of the organizers of the FIS Cross-Country World Cup events in Szklarska Poręba.

Political career

In the 2010 Polish local elections he unsuccessfully stood for office of the mayor of Poznań representing "My Poznaniacy" initiative gaining 7.16% of the votes. In 2013, he officially became a member of the Civic Platform political party and in the 2014 Polish local elections he ran for the post of mayor of Poznań as a Civic Platform candidate. He received 21.46% of the votes in the first round and made it to the second round where he defeated the then-mayor of Poznań Ryszard Grobelny after 16 years of his mayorship in the city receiving 59.09% of the votes. In the 2018 Polish local elections he was successfully re-elected as mayor of Poznań gaining 55.99% of the votes in the first round.

In 2018, as the first mayor of Poznań in history, he provided honorary patronage over the LGBT Poznań Pride Week as well as the Poznań Gay Pride Parade in which he personally participated.

Personal life

He married a notary Joanna Jaśkowiak. He has two children: Jarosław and Stanisław. His interests include cross-country skiing, boxing and theatre, and loves to bike. Jaśkowiak is also an ardent promoter of the musical legacy of Jacek Kaczmarski with whom he collaborated in the past.

References

1964 births
Living people
Mayors of Poznań
Civic Platform politicians
Politicians from Poznań